The following is a list of notable deaths in October 2015.

Entries for each day are listed alphabetically by surname. A typical entry lists information in the following sequence:
Name, age, country of citizenship and reason for notability, established cause of death, reference.

October 2015

1
Božo Bakota, 64, Croatian footballer (NK Zagreb, SK Sturm Graz).
Jacques Brodin, 68, French fencer, Olympic bronze medalist (1964).
Harold Caskey, 77, American politician, member of the Missouri Senate (1977–2005), Parkinson's disease.
Don Edwards, 100, American politician, member of the U.S. House of Representatives from California (1963–1995).
Erma Johnson Hadley, 73, American educator, Chancellor of Tarrant County College, pancreatic cancer.
Illtyd Harrington, 84, British politician.
Max Keeping, 73, Canadian broadcaster (CJOH), cancer.
Stanisław Kociołek, 82, Polish politician, Deputy Prime Minister (1970).
Cal Neeman, 86, American baseball player (Chicago Cubs, Philadelphia Phillies).
Hadi Norouzi, 30, Iranian footballer (Persepolis), heart attack.
Frans Pointl, 82, Dutch writer, nerve disease.
Jacob Pressman, 95, American Conservative rabbi, co-founder of American Jewish University.
Alfredo Prieto, 49, Salvadoran-American serial killer, execution by lethal injection.
Usnija Redžepova, 69, Macedonian singer, lung cancer.
Angelito Sarmiento, 68, Filipino politician, member of the House of Representatives (1992–2001), heart attack.
Gottfried Schatz, 79, Austrian biochemist, cancer.
Johnny Strange, 23, American mountain climber and adventurer, wingsuit collision.
Jean-Jacques Tillmann, 80, Swiss sports journalist.
Joe Wark, 67, Scottish footballer (Motherwell), dementia.

2
Willie Akins, 76, American jazz saxophonist, heart failure.
Naim Araidi, 65, Israeli Druze academic and poet, Ambassador to Norway (2012–2014), cancer.
Steve Camacho, 69, Guyanese cricketer (West Indies), cancer.
François Dagognet, 91, French philosopher.
Eric Arturo Delvalle, 78, Panamanian politician, President (1985–1988).
Ferdinand Joseph Fonseca, 89, Indian Roman Catholic prelate, Auxiliary Bishop of Bombay (1980–2000).
Brian Friel, 86, Irish dramatist (Philadelphia, Here I Come!, Dancing at Lughnasa, Translations).
Rodolfo Frigeri, 73, Argentine economist and politician, Minister of Economy and Public Finances (2001).
Coleridge Goode, 100, Jamaican-born British jazz bassist.
Arthur Lawson Johnston, 3rd Baron Luke, 82, British peer and politician.
Bill Kelley, 89, American football player (Green Bay Packers).
Lindsay Kline, 81, Australian cricketer.
Serhiy Krulykovskyi, 69, Ukrainian footballer (Dynamo Kyiv).
Lubomír Lipský, 92, Czech actor, pneumonia.
Megateo, 39, Colombian criminal.
James Mutende, 53, Ugandan politician, State Minister of Industry (since 2011).
Johnny Paton, 92, Scottish football player (Brentford, Watford, Celtic), coach and manager (Arsenal 'A').
Alan Prince, 100, Canadian bureaucrat, Director of the Nuclear Safety Commission (1975–1978), oversaw the clean up of Kosmos 954.
Hal Schacker, 90, American baseball player (Boston Braves).
Andy Sperandeo, 70, American magazine editor (Model Railroader), cancer.
Jean-Noël Tassez, 59, French journalist.

3
Utpal Kumar Basu, 76, Indian poet.
A. R. M. Abdul Cader, 78, Sri Lankan politician, MP (1989–2004).
Denis Healey, 98, British politician, Secretary of State for Defence (1964–1970), Chancellor of the Exchequer (1974–1979), heart attack.
Lloyd Hinchberger, 84, Canadian ice hockey player (New Haven Blades, Nashville Dixie Flyers).
Olga Hirshhorn, 95, American art collector.
Isao Hosoe, 73, Japanese designer.
Javed Iqbal, 90, Pakistani judge, Justice of the Supreme Court (1986–1989).
Muhammad Nawaz Khan, 71, Pakistani historian and writer, Parkinson's disease.
Stewart McInnes, 78, Canadian lawyer and politician, member of Parliament (1984–1988), heart failure.
Barbara Meek, 81, American actress (Archie Bunker's Place), heart attack.
Raghavan Narasimhan, 78, Indian mathematician.
João Leithardt Neto, 57, Brazilian footballer, Olympic silver medalist (1984), liver cancer.
Paul R. Norby, 102, American Navy rear admiral.
Dave Pike, 77, American jazz musician, emphysema.
Arthur A. Small, 81, American lawyer and poet, kidney failure.
Masjchun Sofwan, 88, Indonesian Governor of Jambi (1979–1989).
Gerald Squires, 77, Canadian artist, cancer.
Christopher Tambling, 51, British composer and choirmaster, cancer.
William Taylor, 77, New Zealand children's writer and politician, Mayor of Ohakune (1981–1988).
Peter Tillers, 72, Latvian-born American legal scholar.
Franciszek Walicki, 94, Polish journalist.

4
Yves Barsacq, 84, French film actor, pneumonia.
José Eduardo Dutra, 58, Brazilian businessman (Petrobras) and politician, Senator (since 1994), cancer.
Tove Fergo, 69, Danish politician, Minister for Ecclesiastical Affairs (2001–2005), member of Folketinget (1994–2005), cancer.
Daniel Fletcher, 41, Australian AFL football player (Geelong), fall.
S. Malcolm Gillis, 74, American academic, President of Rice University (1993–2004), cancer.
Juan Carlos Ibáñez, 46, Argentine footballer (Independiente), beaten.
Jack McKee, 71, Northern Irish politician, Mayor of Larne (1984–1985).
J. Whyatt Mondesire, 66, American journalist and civil rights activist, brain aneurysm.
Eduardo Pavlovsky, 81, Argentine actor and playwright.
Edida Nageswara Rao, 81, Indian film producer (Sankarabharanam).
Job de Ruiter, 85, Dutch politician, Minister of Justice (1977–1981), Minister of Defence (1981–1986).
Sir John Severne, 90, British Royal Air Force officer.
Jim Thomas, 76, American CFL player (Edmonton Eskimos).
Neal Walk, 67, American basketball player (Phoenix Suns, New Orleans Jazz, New York Knicks).
Bob Whan, 82, Australian politician, MP for Eden-Monaro (1972–1975), cardiac arrest.
Oganes Zanazanyan, 68, Greek-born Armenian football player (Ararat Yerevan) and coach, Olympic bronze medalist (1972).

5
Chantal Akerman, 65, Belgian film director (Jeanne Dielman, 23 quai du Commerce, 1080 Bruxelles), suicide.
Frank Albanese, 84, American boxer and actor (The Sopranos, Goodfellas, Dead Presidents), prostate cancer.
Joker Arroyo, 88, Filipino politician, Senator (2001–2013), heart attack.
Gösta Bergkvist, 95, Swedish Olympic runner (1948).
Grace Lee Boggs, 100, American civil rights activist and author.
Larry Brezner, 73, American film producer (Good Morning Vietnam, Throw Momma From the Train, Ride Along), leukemia.
Michael Dean, 82, New Zealand broadcaster (Late Night Line-Up), dementia.
Ana Diosdado, 77, Argentine-born Spanish playwright and actress, cardiorespiratory failure.
Flavio Emoli, 81, Italian footballer (Juventus).
Mary Jane Farell, 95, American bridge player.
Joe Henson, 82, British farmer and conservationist.
Óscar Herrera, 56, Chilean footballer.
Infante Carlos, Duke of Calabria, 77, Spanish nobleman.
Li Yongtai, 87, Chinese lieutenant general and politician.
Trevor Lloyd, 91, Welsh rugby union player.
Henning Mankell, 67, Swedish author (Kurt Wallander), cancer.
John O'Leary, 82, Irish politician, TD for Kerry South (1966–1997).
Anna Pump, 81, German-born American baker and cookbook author, vehicle-pedestrian collision.
Andrew Rubin, 69, American actor (Police Academy, Mary Hartman, Mary Hartman, Joe Bash), lung cancer.
Niall Rudd, 88, Irish-born British classical scholar.
Ales Savitsky, 91, Belarusian writer.
Jos Vandeloo, 90, Belgian author.
Peter Wespi, 72, Swiss Olympic ice hockey player (1964), cancer.

6
Christine Arnothy, 84, Hungarian-French writer.
Duncan Bluck, 88, British businessman (Swire Group).
Kevin Corcoran, 66, American actor and producer (Old Yeller, Pete's Dragon, Sons of Anarchy), colorectal cancer.
Rich Davis, 89, American businessman, creator of KC Masterpiece barbecue sauce.
Juan Martin Garcia, 35, American murderer, execution by lethal injection.
Charles Coulston Gillispie, 97, American historian, President of History of Science Society (1965–1966).
Árpád Göncz, 93, Hungarian writer and politician, President (1990–2000).
Smokey Johnson, 78, American drummer.
Stasys Povilaitis, 68, Lithuanian singer and poet, lung cancer.
Fernando Rainieri, 74–75, Dominican politician, minister of tourism.
Billy Joe Royal, 73, American pop and country singer ("Down in the Boondocks", "Cherry Hill Park", "Burned Like a Rocket").
Vladimir Shlapentokh, 88, Ukrainian-born American sociologist.
Sandra Spuzich, 78, American golfer.
William Stanley, 58, American mammalogist, director of collections at Field Museum.
Carmen Marina Torres, 58, Colombian actress.
Otto Tucker, 92, Canadian educationalist.
Juan Vicente Ugarte del Pino, 92, Peruvian historian and jurist.
Ivan Vidav, 97, Slovenian mathematician.

7
Gene Allen, 97, American art director (My Fair Lady), President of the Academy of Motion Picture Arts and Sciences (1983–1985).
Ray Appleton, 74, American jazz drummer, heart failure.
Pushpa Bhuyan, 69, Indian classical dancer.
Ângelo da Cunha Pinto, 66, Brazilian-Portuguese chemist.
Friedrich Diedrich, 80, German Roman Catholic theologian.
Dominique Dropsy, 63, French footballer (Valenciennes, Strasbourg, Bordeaux), leukemia.
Harry Gallatin, 88, American Hall of Fame basketball player (New York Knicks, Detroit Pistons) and coach (New York Knicks, St. Louis Hawks), complications from surgery.
Hossein Hamadani, 60, Iranian military officer.
Andy Hawkins, 57, American football player (Tampa Bay Buccaneers, San Diego Chargers, Kansas City Chiefs).
Hy Hollinger, 97, American journalist (Variety) and publicist (Paramount Pictures), international editor of The Hollywood Reporter (1992–2008).
Hasan Jamil, 63, Pakistani cricketer, cardiac arrest.
Kenneth Koe, 90, American chemist.
Elena Lucena, 101, Argentine film actress.
W. R. Mitchell, 87, British writer and editor (Dalesman).
Julius Muthamia, 81, Kenyan politician.
Maria Lúcia Prandi, 70, Brazilian academic and politician, cancer.
Charles P. West, 94, American politician, member of the Delaware House of Representatives (1956–1958, 1978–2002).
Helen Wilkes, 88, American businesswoman and politician, first female Mayor of West Palm Beach, Florida (1978–1979), City Commissioner (1976–1988).
Arthur Woods, 86, New Zealand rugby union player (Southland, national team).
Clive Young, 67, British Anglican prelate, Bishop of Dunwich (1999–2013), complications from surgery.
Gail Zappa, 70, American businesswoman, lung cancer.
Jurelang Zedkaia, 65, Marshallese Iroijlaplap and politician, President of the Marshall Islands (2009–2012), heart attack.

8
Gottfried Anglberger, 84, Austrian Olympic wrestler.
Richard Davies, 89, Welsh character actor (Please Sir!), Alzheimer's disease.
Teifion Davies, 75, Australian Olympic boxer.
Eric Dawe, 94, Canadian businessman and politician, member of the Newfoundland House of Assembly for Port de Grave (1962–1971, 1975–1979).
Jim Diamond, 64, Scottish singer-songwriter ("I Should Have Known Better"), pulmonary edema.
Dennis Eichhorn, 70, American writer and comic book artist, pneumonia.
Tom Goode, 76, American football player (Baltimore Colts).
Enrique Gratas, 71, Argentine television presenter, lung cancer.
Dora Holzhandler, 87, French-born British painter.
Lindy Infante, 75, American football coach (Green Bay Packers, Indianapolis Colts), pneumonia.
Bob Jensen, 89, American football player (Chicago Rockets/Hornets, Baltimore Colts).
István Nemeskürty, 90, Hungarian writer and screenwriter.
Paul Prudhomme, 75, American chef, cookbook writer and restaurateur, recipient of the Order of Agricultural Merit (1980).
Elizabeth Ramsey, 83, Filipino comedian, singer and actress, hyperglycemic attack.
Massimo Scaglione, 84, Italian film director.
Hugh Scully, 72, British television presenter (Antiques Roadshow).
Jan Wallman, 93, American nightclub owner and producer.
Stephen B. Wiley, 86, American politician, member of the New Jersey Senate (1973–1978).

9
Ben Abraham, 90, Polish-born Brazilian Holocaust survivor, author and journalist.
Jean Badal, 88, Hungarian cinematographer.
Ronald Brunskill, 86, British architectural historian.
Du Runsheng, 102, Chinese politician.
Raymond Duncan, 84, American entrepreneur and winemaker (Silver Oak Cellars).
Gordon Honeycombe, 79, British newscaster, author and actor, leukaemia.
Geoffrey Howe, Baron Howe of Aberavon, 88, British politician, Chancellor of the Exchequer (1979–1983), Foreign Secretary (1983–1989), heart attack.
Ravindra Jain, 71, Indian composer, kidney illness.
Julia Jones, 92, British scriptwriter (Quiet as a Nun, Our Mutual Friend).
Koopsta Knicca, 40, American rapper (Three 6 Mafia), stroke.
Blanca Magrassi Scagno, 92, Mexican women's rights activist.
Dave Meyers, 62, American basketball player (UCLA, Milwaukee Bucks), cancer.
Bruce Nazarian, 66, American musician (Brownsville Station) and producer.
Jerry Parr, 85, American Secret Service agent, extricated Ronald Reagan during assassination attempt, heart failure.
Tony Rafty, 99, Australian caricaturist, complications from pneumonia.
N. Ramani, 81, Indian flautist.
Larry Rosen, 75, American jazz producer, brain cancer.
Ronald Lampman Watts, 86, Canadian academic, Principal of Queen's University (1974–1984).
Eric Wright, 86, Canadian crime writer, kidney cancer.
Zdravko Zupan, 65, Yugoslav Serbian comic-book creator and historian.

10
Alvin P. Adams Jr., 73, American diplomat, Ambassador to Peru (1993–1996), Haiti (1989–1992), and Djibouti (1983–1985), heart attack.
Sam Adams, Sr., 67, American football player (New England Patriots, New Orleans Saints).
Nuriyya Ahmadova, 64, Azerbaijani actress, heart attack.
Diepreye Alamieyeseigha, 62, Nigerian politician, Governor of Bayelsa (1999–2005).
Kane Ashcroft, 29, English footballer (York City), cancer.
Hilla Becher, 81, German photographer.
Wes Funk, 46, Canadian author.
Sophie el Goulli, 83, Tunisian writer and historian.
Garry Hancock, 61, American baseball player (Boston Red Sox, Oakland Athletics).
Richard F. Heck, 84, American chemist, Nobel Laureate in Chemistry (2010).
Tord Johansson, 60, Swedish businessman.
Lyudmila Kedrina, 54, Russian Soviet alpine skier, cancer.
Steve Mackay, 66, American saxophonist (The Stooges), sepsis.
Manorama, 78, Indian Tamil actress, heart attack.
Sir David Penry-Davey, 73, British jurist.
Rochunga Pudaite, 88, Indian writer and translator.
Maggie Riley, 79, British actress (Hazell, Grange Hill).
Tex Rudloff, 89, American sound editor (Taxi Driver, The Buddy Holly Story, The Warriors).
Mahmoud Sehili, 84, Tunisian artist.
Elias Skaff, 67, Lebanese politician.
Sybil Stockdale, 90, American human rights activist, co-founder of National League of Families, Parkinson's disease.
Stan Stoker, 71, English cricketer.
Robbin Thompson, 66, American singer-songwriter (Steel Mill), cancer.

11
Ali Barraud, 97, Burkinabe politician.
John Berg, 83, American art director and designer, pneumonia.
Dean Chance, 74, American baseball player (Los Angeles Angels, Minnesota Twins, Detroit Tigers) and boxing official, heart attack.
S. A. David, 91, Sri Lankan Tamil political activist.
Jack Drake, 81, American politician, member of the Iowa House of Representatives (since 1993).
David Hunt, 55, British racing driver.
Smokin' Joe Kubek, 58, American blues guitarist, heart attack.
Bob Minkler, 78, American sound mixer (Star Wars, Tron, Mask), Oscar winner (1978), respiratory failure.
Salvador Trane Modesto, 85, Filipino Roman Catholic prelate, Auxiliary Bishop of Dumaguete (1978–1987) and San Carlos (1987–2005).
John Murphy, 56, Australian drummer, percussionist and multi-instrumental session musician, cancer.
Andrew Sayers, 58, British-born Australian curator, Director of the National Portrait Gallery (1998–2010), pancreatic cancer.

12
Sakit Aliyev, 49, Azerbaijani football player and coach (Turan IK).
Mary Adrian Barrett, 86, American Roman Catholic nun.
Anna Campbell Bliss, 90, American artist and architect.
Sergio Caprari, 83, Italian boxer, Olympic silver medalist (1952).
Kevin Cass, 77, Australian Grand Prix motorcycle road racer.
Paul Costa, 73, American football player (Buffalo Bills).
Sam de Brito, 46, Australian author and columnist.
Peter Dougherty, 59, American music television executive, creator (Yo! MTV Raps) and video producer, heart attack.
Colleen Farrington, 79, American model and singer.
David Finnegan, 74, American attorney, talk show host and politician, lung cancer.
Ernestine Friedl, 95, American anthropologist.
Hal Hackady, 93, American lyricist and screenwriter.
Abdallah Kigoda, 61, Tanzanian politician, Minister of Industry and Trade (since 2012), cancer.
Levent Kırca, 67, Turkish actor, liver cancer.
Armin Kircher, 48, Austrian composer and conductor, heart failure.
Kazuo Kumakura, 88, Japanese actor.
Joan Leslie, 90, American actress (High Sierra, Sergeant York, Yankee Doodle Dandy).
Robert Leuci, 75, American police detective and writer, complications after surgery.
Joseph J. Minnick, 82, American politician, member of Maryland House of Delegates (1995–2015), blood disease.
George Mueller, 97, American space engineer, Associate Administrator of the NASA Office of Manned Space Flight (1963–1969).
Maksut Narikbaev, 75, Kazakh jurist, Chairman of the Supreme Court of Kazakhstan (1996–2000).
Sophie Nogler, 91, Austrian Olympic alpine skier (1948).
Tom Ognibene, 72, American politician, member of the New York City Council (1992–2001), cancer.
Leo J. Reding, 91, American politician, member of the Minnesota House of Representatives (1975–1995).
Gennady Riger, 67, Israeli politician, member of the Knesset (1999–2003).
Laurence Smart, 87, Australian cricketer.

13
Rosalyn Baxandall, 76, American historian and feminist activist, kidney cancer.
Guenther Boden, 80, German-born American endocrinologist.
Arsenio Chirinos, 80, Venezuelan Olympic cyclist (1956, 1960).
Sir James Cruthers, 90, Australian business executive, pneumonia.
Jim Dobbin, 88, Canadian football player (Calgary Stampeders).
Duncan Druce, 76, English composer and musicologist.
Kyogon Hagiyama, 83, Japanese politician, member of the House of Representatives for Toyama Prefecture (1990–2009), heart failure.
Bruce Hyde, 74, American educator and actor (Star Trek), throat cancer.
Sue Lloyd-Roberts, 64, British television journalist (BBC, ITN), leukaemia.
Leif Mevik, 85, Norwegian diplomat.
Julien J. Studley, 88, Belgian-born American businessman.
Skatemaster Tate, 56, American musician and television show host, liver cancer.
K. Velayudam, 65, Sri Lankan politician and trade unionist, MP for Badulla (2001–2004, 2014–2015).
Michael Walsh, 88, British Army general and scouting leader, Chief Scout (1982–1988).
Michael John Wise, 97, British geographer.
 Mohamed Sohel Al-Masum, 40, Bangladeshi footballer

14
Nurlan Balgimbayev, 67, Kazakh politician, Prime Minister (1997–1999), cancer.
Bobby Braithwaite, 78, Northern Irish footballer (Linfield, Middlesbrough, national team).
Antonio Cedrés, 87, Spanish footballer (Real Betis).
Marianne Dickerson, 54, American long-distance runner.
José Luis García, 91, Mexican baseball player and manager (Tigres de Quintana Roo).
Peter Hermes, 93, German diplomat.
Mathieu Kérékou, 82, Beninese politician, President (1972–1991, 1996–2006).
Margaret Keyes, 97, American historian and preserver of historic buildings.
Florența Mihai, 60, Romanian tennis player, coach and official, Secretary General of the RTF (1984–1989), cancer.
Jordi Miralles, 53, Spanish politician, member of the Parliament of Catalonia (2003–2012), meningitis.
Bruce Mozert, 98, American photographer.
Sol Roper, 79, English rugby league player (Workington Town).
Aubrey Rozzell, 82, American football player (Pittsburgh Steelers, Montreal Alouettes).
Radhakrishna Hariram Tahiliani, 85, Indian admiral and politician, Chief of the Naval Staff (1984–1987), Governor of Sikkim (1990–1994).
Paul W. Taylor, 91, American philosopher.
Robert M. White, 92, American meteorologist, director of the National Weather Service (1963–1965), ESSA (1965–1970), NOAA (1970–1977), complications of dementia.
Miranda Yap, 67, Singaporean chemical engineer.

15
Lennart Anderson, 87, American painter.
Robert D'Silva, 90, Pakistani Roman Catholic priest.
Sergei Filippenkov, 44, Russian football player (CSKA Moscow) and coach, heart attack.
Yoshihiko Funazaki, 70, Japanese writer.
Nate Huffman, 40, American basketball player (Toronto Raptors, Maccabi Tel Aviv), bladder cancer.
Harriet Klausner, 63, American book reviewer.
Don Livingstone, 67, Australian politician, Queensland MLA for Ipswich West (1989–1998, 2001–2006), stomach cancer.
Dölf Mettler, 81, Swiss yodeler and painter.
Joel Gustave Nana Ngongang, 33, Cameroonian LGBT rights activist.
Neill Sheridan, 93, American baseball player (Boston Red Sox), pneumonia.
J. Robert Stassen, 88, American politician, member of the Minnesota Senate (1973–1976), Alzheimer's disease and dementia.
Michael Stevens, 48, American television producer (Kennedy Center Honors), stomach cancer.
Stella Sutherland, 91, Scottish poet.
Kenneth D. Taylor, 81, Canadian diplomat, Ambassador to Iran (1977–1980), awarded U.S. Congressional Gold Medal for role in "Canadian Caper", colorectal cancer.
Carlos Alberto Brilhante Ustra, 83, Brazilian military officer, cancer.
Larry N. Vanderhoef, 74, American biochemist, Chancellor of UC Davis (1994–2009), complications from ischemic strokes.
Col Westaway, 79, Australian cricketer.
Tyrone Young, 55, American football player (New Orleans Saints), multiple myeloma.

16
Ralph Andrews, 87, American television producer (You Don't Say!, Liar's Club, Lingo), Alzheimer's disease.
Mikhail Burtsev, 59, Russian Soviet fencer, six-time world champion, two-time Olympic champion (1976, 1980).
Richard J. Cardamone, 90, American judge, member of the Second Circuit Court of Appeals (since 1981).
Francesc de Paula Burguera, 87, Spanish journalist and politician, member of the Congress of Deputies (1977–1979).
David Drew, 77, English ballet dancer.
Deo Filikunjombe, 43, Tanzanian politician, MP for Ludewa (2010–2015), helicopter crash.
James W. Fowler, 75, American theologian and pastoral psychologist, complications related to Alzheimer's disease.
Luciano García Alén, 87, Spanish physician and ethnographer.
Joseph E. Irenas, 75, American judge, member of the US District Court for New Jersey (since 1992), fall.
William James, 85, Australian soldier and military physician.
John Jennings, 61, American musician and music producer, kidney cancer.
Olimpo López, 97, Colombian pastry chef.
Barbara Orzechowska-Ryszel, 84, Polish Olympic fencer (1960).
Beny Primm, 87, American physician, HIV/AIDS researcher and activist, kidney disease.
Irwin Schiff, 87, American tax protester, lung cancer.
Memduh Ün, 95, Turkish film director.
Vera Williams, 88, American children's writer.
Julia Wilson-Dickson, 66, English dialect coach (Braveheart, The Theory of Everything, Chocolat), brain haemorrhage.

17
Lois Bellman, 89, American baseball player (AAGPBL).
Manoel da Silva Costa, 62, Brazilian footballer.
Danièle Delorme, 89, French actress.
Johnny Hamilton, 66, Scottish footballer (Hibernian, Rangers, St Johnstone).
Howard Kendall, 69, English football player and manager (Blackburn Rovers, Everton, Athletic Bilbao).
Anne-Marie Lizin, 66, Belgian politician, President of the Senate (2004–2007).
Morando Morandini, 91, Italian film critic and author.
Houston Ridge, 71, American football player (San Diego Chargers).
Peter Sands, 91, Irish politician.
Tom Smith, 67, American politician.
Emory Tate, 56, American chess player.
Rosa Tschudi, 91, Swiss chef and author.
Norman Vickar, 98, Canadian politician.

18
Franklin April, 31, Namibian footballer, asthma attack.
André Bourgeois, 87, Belgian politician, Minister of Agriculture (1992–1995).
Ignazio Cannavò, 93, Italian Roman Catholic prelate, Archbishop of Messina-Lipari-Santa Lucia del Mela (1986–1997).
Kallu Chidambaram, 70, Indian comedy actor.
Robert Dickerson, 91, Australian artist, cancer.
Gamal El-Ghitani, 70, Egyptian author, respiratory complications.
Robert W. Farquhar, 83, American NASA mission design specialist.
Walter S. Graf, 98, American cardiologist.
Brian Hurn, 76, Australian cricketer (South Australia).
Jack Johnson, 81, American football player (Chicago Bears, Buffalo Bills).
Héctor Mario López Fuentes, 85, Guatemalan general, prostate cancer.
Ankaralı Namık, 38, Turkish folk singer, fall.
Tommy O'Keefe, 87, American basketball player (Washington Capitols, Baltimore Bullets) and coach (Georgetown Hoyas).
Anita Sarko, 68, American DJ and journalist, suicide by hanging.
Loren P. Thompson, 88, American politician.
Harry Verran, 85, Canadian politician, MP for South West Nova (1993–1997).
Frank Watkins, 47, American bassist (Obituary, Gorgoroth), cancer.
Paul West, 85, British-born American novelist and poet, pneumonia.

19
Bill Collier, 94, Australian rugby league player (St. George Dragons).
Bill Daley, 96, American football player.
Ron Greener, 81, English footballer (Darlington).
Ena Kadic, 26, Bosnian-born Austrian model, fall.
Patricia Kern, 88, British mezzo-soprano and voice teacher.
Fleming Mackell, 86, Canadian ice hockey player (Toronto Maple Leafs, Boston Bruins).
Alessandro Plotti, 83, Italian Roman Catholic prelate, Archbishop of Pisa (1986–2008).
Dick Sharples, 88, British scriptwriter.
Ali Treki, 78, Libyan diplomat, Foreign Minister (1976–1982, 1984–1986), President of the United Nations General Assembly (2009–2010).
D. C. Wilcutt, 92, American basketball player (St. Louis Bombers).
Roland R. Wright, 96, American Mormon missionary.

20
Makis Dendrinos, 65, Greek basketball player and coach, complications from a heart attack.
Rufus Granderson, 79, American football player.
Arno Gruen, 92, German-born American psychologist.
Neeltje Karelse, 89, Dutch Olympic track-and-field athlete (1948).
Gilberto Jiménez Narváez, 78, Colombian Roman Catholic prelate, Bishop of Riohacha (1996–2001).
Kazimierz Łaski, 93, Polish-born Austrian economist.
Yoná Magalhães, 80, Brazilian actress, complications following heart surgery.
Juan Negri, 90, Chilean footballer.
Brian Oliver, 86, Australian Olympic athlete (1956).
Syed Zahoor Qasim, 88, Indian marine biologist.
Don Rendell, 89, English jazz musician.
Sir John Scott, 84, New Zealand medical researcher, President of the Royal Society of New Zealand (1997–2000).
Ian Steel, 86, Scottish racing cyclist.
K. S. L. Swamy, 77, Indian film director and singer, National Film Award for Best Children's Film (1989).
Jane Wardle, 64, British clinical psychologist, cancer.
Cory Wells, 74, American singer (Three Dog Night), complications from multiple myeloma.

21
Peter Baldwin, 82, British actor (Coronation Street).
Piercarlo Beroldi, 87, Italian Olympic sports shooter.
France Bučar, 92, Slovene politician, Speaker of the National Assembly (1990–1992).
Gregory Robert Choppin, 87, American nuclear chemist.
E. Virgil Conway, 85, American civil servant.
Marty Ingels, 79, American actor (I'm Dickens, He's Fenster, Pac-Man), stroke.
Jim Jodat, 61, American football player, cancer.
Suryanath U. Kamath, 78, Indian historian.
Francis Kiddle, 73, British philatelist, lung cancer.
Ossie Langfelder, 89, Austrian-born American politician, Mayor of Springfield, Illinois (1987–1995).
Rhoda Leonard, 87, American baseball player (AAGPBL).
Michael Meacher, 75, British politician, MP for Oldham West (1970–1997) and Oldham West and Royton (since 1997).
Norman W. Moore, 92, British conservationist, researcher into the use of organochloride pesticides.
William Murray, 8th Earl of Mansfield, 85, Scottish nobleman and politician, appointed MEP (1973–1975).
Diana Pullein-Thompson, 90, British writer.
Jim Robertson, 87, American baseball player (Philadelphia Athletics, Kansas City Athletics).
Yawar Saeed, 80, Pakistani cricketer and manager, brain tumour.
Anton Solomoukha, 69, Ukrainian-born French artist and photographer.
Sir Christopher Walford, 80, British solicitor and politician, Lord Mayor of London (1994–1995).
Sheldon Wolin, 93, American political theorist.

22
Willem Aantjes, 92, Dutch politician, member of the House of Representatives (1959–1978).
Çetin Altan, 88, Turkish writer and politician, MP (1965–1969).
Murphy Anderson, 89, American comic book artist (Superman, Green Lantern, Hawkman), creator of Zatanna, heart failure.
John Backe, 83, American television executive, President and CEO of CBS (1977–1980), heart failure.
Scott Barr, 99, American politician, member of the Washington House of Representatives (1977–1983) and Senate (1983–1993).
Larry Clarke, 90, Canadian businessman and Chancellor of York University (1986–1991).
Tien Feng, 87, Chinese actor.
Juan Ferrer, 60, Cuban judoka, Olympic silver medalist (1980).
Esther Geller, 93, American painter.
Jürgen Henkys, 85, German theologian.
Labh Janjua, 57, Indian singer-songwriter, suspected heart attack.
Louis Jung, 98, French politician, Senator for Bas-Rhin (1952–1995).
Bryan Lowe, 89, English cricketer (Cheshire).
Jerome Kass, 78, American screenwriter (Queen of the Stardust Ballroom), prostate cancer.
Gorden Kelley, 77, American football player (San Francisco 49ers, Washington Redskins).
Arnold Klein, 70, American dermatologist.
Mark Murphy, 83, American jazz vocalist, complications from pneumonia.
Michael Margaret Stewart, 62, American lawyer, First Lady of Alaska (1986–1990), ovarian cancer.
Muhammad Dawood Sultanzoy, 63, Afghan politician, shot.
Tomás Torres Mercado, 54, Mexican politician, member of the Senate (2006–2012), plane crash.
John Tsitouris, 79, American baseball player (Cincinnati Reds, Kansas City Athletics).
Jorge Valls, 82, Cuban activist and poet.
Joshua Wheeler, 39, American army soldier, shot.

23
Jake Bailey, 37, American make-up artist, suicide by carbon monoxide poisoning.
Bill Berezowski, 87, Canadian football player (Hamilton Tiger-Cats, Toronto Argonauts).
Leon Bibb, 93, American folk singer.
John Bossy, 82, British historian.
Michel Couriard, 61, British Channel Islander civil servant, cancer.
Roger De Clerck, 91, Belgian chief executive (Beaulieu International Group).
Arthur Gilbert, 94, British nonagenarian triathlete.
Reggie Hannah, 56, American basketball player, cancer.
Guðbjartur Hannesson, 65, Icelandic politician, cancer.
Antony Hignell, 87, British sportsman.
Krunoslav Hulak, 64, Croatian chess grandmaster, lung cancer.
Roar Johansen, 80, Norwegian footballer (Fredrikstad, national team).
Bill Keith, 75, American banjo player, cancer.
Albert Kish, 78, Hungarian-born Canadian film director.
Takis Papageorgopoulos, 81, Greek army general and politician.
Peter Price, 83, Scottish footballer (Ayr United, St Mirren).
Jim Roberts, 75, Canadian ice hockey player (Montreal Canadiens, St. Louis Blues), cancer.
Fred Sands, 77, American real estate mogul, stroke.
Thomas G. Stemberg, 66, American office supply executive (Staples Inc.) and philanthropist, stomach cancer.
Paride Tumburus, 76, Italian footballer, heart attack.
Lyubov Tyurina, 72, Russian Soviet volleyball player, Olympic champion (1972).
Zhu Muzhi, 98, Chinese politician.

24
Sir Michael Beetham, 92, British marshal of the air force, Chief of the Air Staff (1977–1982).
Carlos Bousoño, 92, Spanish poet and literary critic.
Alvin Bronstein, 87, American lawyer and prisoner rights activist, complications from Alzheimer's disease.
Christopher Chapman, 88, Canadian writer, director, editor and cinematographer (A Place to Stand), creator of the multi-dynamic image technique.
Hasset Go, 29, Filipino chef, liver cancer.
Kirsty Howard, 20, British hospice fundraiser, complications from a kidney infection and heart attack.
Shamshad Hussain, 69, Indian painter, liver cancer.
Margarita Khemlin, 55, Ukrainian author.
Edythe Kirchmaier, 107, American centenarian, oldest known Facebook user.
Ján Chryzostom Korec, 91, Slovak Roman Catholic prelate, Jesuit Cardinal and Bishop of Nitra (1990–2005).
Eteiwi Majali, 64–65, Jordanian politician, member of the House of Representatives (since 2013).
Maureen O'Hara, 95, Irish-American actress (How Green Was My Valley, Miracle on 34th Street, The Quiet Man).
Nat Peck, 90, American jazz trombonist.
Sandra Peterson, 79, American politician, member of the Minnesota House of Representatives (2005–2013).
Gaston Poulain, 88, French Roman Catholic prelate, Bishop of Périgueux (1988–2004).
William John Quinn, 104, American railroad executive.
Bhaskar Save, 93, Indian farmer and activist.
Thomas Sunesson, 56, Swedish footballer (Malmö FF).
Ryszard Wcisło, 82, Polish scout leader.

25
*Cao Ying, 92, Chinese translator of Russian literature.
David Cesarani, 58, British Jewish historian, Holocaust specialist, complications from spinal surgery.
Fehmi Demir, 58, Turkish politician, leader of the Rights and Freedoms Party, traffic collision.
Wojciech Fangor, 92, Polish artist.
Pijush Ganguly, 50, Indian actor, multiple organ failure following traffic collision.
Ken Graveney, 90, English cricketer (Gloucestershire).
Marlo Henderson, 67, American session guitarist.
Lisa Jardine, 71, British early modern historian, cancer.
Vladimír Kobranov, 88, Czech ice hockey player, Olympic silver medalist (1948).
Cecil Lolo, 27, South African footballer (Ajax Cape Town), traffic collision.
Dennis Morgan, 63, American football player (Dallas Cowboys), heart attack.
Georg Müller, 64, German-born Norwegian Roman Catholic prelate, Bishop of Trondheim (1997–2009).
Flip Saunders, 60, American basketball coach (Detroit Pistons, Washington Wizards, Minnesota Timberwolves), lymphoma.
Lee Shaw, 89, American jazz pianist.
Matt Watson, 79, Scottish footballer (Kilmarnock).
Basil Williams, 65, Jamaican cricketer (West Indies), heart attack.

26
Willis Carto, 89, American white supremacist and Holocaust denier, founder of the American Free Press.
S. Barry Cooper, 72, British mathematician, computational theorist, author and activist.
Robert P. DeVecchi, 85, American rescue foundation executive, Director of International Rescue Committee.
Peter Farquhar, 69, English novelist, homicide.
Steve Goss, 65, American politician, member of the North Carolina Senate (2006–2010), cancer.
Zeke Hogeland, 89, American college basketball coach (Northern Iowa).
Penelope Houston, 88, British film critic, editor of Sight & Sound (1956–1990).
Leo Kadanoff, 78, American physicist (University of Chicago), President of American Physical Society (2006–2008), respiratory failure.
Robert Light, 88, American politician, member of the New Mexico House of Representatives (1985–1996).
Giuseppe Nazzaro, 77, Italian-born Syrian Roman Catholic prelate, Vicar Apostolic of Aleppo (2002–2013).
David Rodriguez, 63, American singer-songwriter.
Sam Sarpong, 40, British-born American model and actor (Love Don't Cost a Thing, Farm House, Anchor Baby), suicide by jumping.
Ed Walker, 83, American radio personality (Joy Boys), cancer.

27
Eric Allen, 66, American football player (Toronto Argonauts, Michigan State).
Mitzura Arghezi, 90, Romanian actress, journalist and politician, MP (1996–2004).
Helen Astin, 83, Greek-born American scholar and feminist.
Ayerdhal, 56, French author, cancer.
Ranjit Roy Chaudhury, 84, Indian pharmacologist.
Betsy Drake, 92, American actress and writer.
Philip French, 82, British film critic (The Observer) and BBC radio producer, heart attack.
Herbie Goins, 76, American R&B singer.
Henry Hook, 60, American crossword compiler.
Miyu Matsuki, 38, Japanese voice actress, lymphoma due to chronic active EBV infection.
Tshepo Ngwane, 39, South African actor.
Gulam Noon, Baron Noon, 79, Indian-born British food production businessman, chancellor of University of East London, liver cancer.
Noriyoshi Ohrai, 79, Japanese illustrator, pneumonia.
Stanley Philips, 95, English cricketer.
Rajendra Singh Rana, 54, Indian politician, Uttar Pradesh MLA for Deoband (2002–2007, 2012–2015), cancer.
Ralph Richeson, 63, American actor (Deadwood, Hancock), heart failure.
Yoshito Takamine, 89, American politician and labor leader, member of the Hawaii House of Representatives (1959–1984).
Tillman, 10, American skateboarding English bulldog, heart disease.
Irving Ungerman, 92, Canadian boxing manager (George Chuvalo, Clyde Gray), promoter, poultry executive and philanthropist, stroke.

28
Pazuzu Algarad, 36–37, American murderer, suicide by exsanguination. 
Peter Barrett, 59, Irish Anglican prelate, Bishop of Cashel and Ossory (2002–2006).
Jack A. Brown, 86, American politician, member of the Arizona House of Representatives (1963–1974, 1987–1996, 2005–2011) and Senate (1999–2004).
Diane Charlemagne, 51, British singer (Urban Cookie Collective), cancer.
Joseph Dergham, 85, Lebanese-born Egyptian Maronite Catholic hierarch, Bishop of Cairo (1989–2005).
Nancy Dye, 56, American historian and educator, President of Oberlin College (1994–2007).
Bruce L. Edwards, 63, American literary scholar, expert on C.S. Lewis, ruptured aortic aneurysm.
Nicolás Fuentes, 74, Peruvian footballer (national team), pulmonary failure as a complication of diabetes.
Tom Hosier, 73, American college football coach (Eureka, Macalester, Winona State).
Attila Kálmán, 77, Hungarian educator and politician, MP (1990–1994).
Sir Gerry Neale, 74, British politician, MP for North Cornwall (1979–1992).
Gyang Pwajok, 48, Nigerian politician, member of the Senate for Plateau (2012–2015), complications from hepatocellular carcinoma.
Jorge Scarso, 99, Italian-born Brazilian Roman Catholic prelate, Bishop of Patos de Minas (1967–1992).
Tadeusz Sobolewicz, 92, Polish actor and author, survivor of Nazi concentration camps.
Scott James Wells, 54, American actor (Superboy) and model.

29
Nick Bolkovac, 87, American football player (Pittsburgh Steelers) .
Per Brunvand, 78, Norwegian newspaper editor.
Luther Burden, 62, American basketball player (Virginia Squires, New York Knicks), heart failure.
Jacques Delécluse, 82, French percussionist.
Kenneth Gilbert, 84, British actor (Doctor Who, House of Cards).
Ernesto Herrera, 73, Filipino politician, member of the House of Representatives (1998–2001) and Senate (1987–1998), heart attack.
Tassie Johnson, 77, Australian football player (Melbourne).
Peter Knott, 59, Australian politician, member of the House of Representatives for Gilmore (1993–1996).
Lowell B. Komie, 87, American lawyer and author.
Boris Kristančič, 82, Slovene Olympic basketball player (1960) and coach.
Oddvar Kruge, 89, footballer
Franz Thaler, 90, Italian author.
Ranko Žeravica, 85, Serbian basketball coach (Partizan).

30
Mel Daniels, 71, American Hall of Fame basketball player (Indiana Pacers).
Haliru Dantoro, 77, Nigerian traditional ruler and politician, Emir of Borgu (since 2000), member of the Senate (1993).
Zehra Deović, 76, Bosnian sevdalinka folk singer.
Wallace Dollase, 78, American horse trainer.
Joel Elkes, 101, American medical researcher.
Colin Hilton, 78, English cricketer (Lancashire).
John McCollum, 93, American opera singer.
Al Molinaro, 96, American actor (The Odd Couple, Happy Days, Joanie Loves Chachi), complications from infected gall bladder.
Lucídio Portela Nunes, 93, Brazilian politician, Governor of Piauí (1979–1983).
Wallace E. Oates, 78, American economist.
Sinan Şamil Sam, 41, German-born Turkish professional boxer, liver failure.
Double Shah, 51, Pakistani fraudster.
Norm Siebern, 82, American baseball player (Kansas City Athletics, New York Yankees, Baltimore Orioles).

31
Ants Antson, 76, Estonian speed skater, Olympic champion (1964).
Thomas Blatt, 88, Polish writer and Holocaust survivor following escape from Sobibór, complications from dementia.
Sergio Donadoni, 101, Italian Egyptologist.
Patricia Farrar, 84, American educator, First Lady of South Dakota (1969–1971), Parkinson's disease and Lewy body dementia.
Ivan Frgić, 62, Serbian Yugoslav Olympic silver medallist wrestler (1976).
Howard Green, 90, Canadian-American physician and clinical researcher (MIT, Harvard Medical School), pioneer in skin regeneration, respiratory failure.
Hroar Hansen, 68, Norwegian politician, newspaper owner and editor (Morgenbladet).
Charles Herbert, 66, American actor (Wagon Train, 13 Ghosts, The Fly), heart attack.
Tadeusz Jodłowski, 90, Polish artist.
Pinky Kravitz, 88, American radio broadcaster (WOND).
Dick Lane, 88, American politician, member of the Georgia House of Representatives (1966–1994).
Colin Nicholson, 79, New Zealand lawyer and jurist, judge of the High Courts of New Zealand (1998–2009) and the Cook Islands (2005–2012).
Ryūzō Saki, 78, Japanese writer, throat cancer.
Gus Savage, 90, American newspaper executive and politician, member of the U.S. House of Representatives for Illinois's 2nd district (1981–1993).
David Shugar, 100, Polish-born Canadian physicist.
Benjamin Drake Wright, 89, American psychometrician.
T. M. Wright, 68, American author, Parkinson's disease.

References

2015-10
 10